Darrell Hackney (born August 7, 1983) is a former American football quarterback. He was signed by the Cleveland Browns as an undrafted free agent in 2006. He played college football at UAB.

Hackney has also been a member of the Denver Broncos, Winnipeg Blue Bombers and Florida Tuskers.

Early years
Hackney attended Douglass High School in Atlanta, Georgia and was a student and a letterman in football and baseball. In football, the Atlanta Journal-Constitution twice named him as an All-State Honorable Mention selection, and as a senior, he was also named the Atlanta Quarterback of the Year and his team's Most Valuable Player. Hackney graduated from Douglass High School in the year 2001.

College career
Attending college at the UAB, he was redshirted in 2001 as a true freshman. Hackney currently holds several of the career UAB passing records, including passing yards (9,886 yards), touchdowns (71 touchdowns), completions (694 completions) and most total offense per game (243.4 yards per game). He also holds several single-season records for the Blazers.

Professional career

Cleveland Browns
Hackney was not drafted and was subsequently signed as a free agent with the Cleveland Browns. The Browns cut him on September 2, 2006.

Denver Broncos
On January 2, 2007, he signed with the Denver Broncos. Hackney spent the training camp with the Broncos where he competed with Preston Parsons, and Patrick Ramsey for the backup quarterback position.

On August 31, 2008, Hackney was signed to the Broncos practice squad. He was promoted to the active roster on November 1 after quarterback Patrick Ramsey was placed on injured reserve.

Three days after the Broncos traded for quarterback Kyle Orton, Hackney was waived on April 6, 2009.

Winnipeg Blue Bombers
Hackney was signed by the Winnipeg Blue Bombers on May 28, 2009. He was released on June 8, 2009.

Florida Tuskers
Hackney was signed by the Florida Tuskers of the United Football League, but was released prior to the 2009 season on September 26.

References

External links
Denver Broncos bio
UAB Blazers bio

1983 births
Living people
Players of American football from Atlanta
American football quarterbacks
Players of Canadian football from Atlanta
Canadian football quarterbacks
UAB Blazers football players
Cleveland Browns players
Denver Broncos players
Winnipeg Blue Bombers players
Florida Tuskers players